Colliergate is a street in the city centre of York, in England.

History
The are occupied by the street lay outside the Roman city walls, but fell within the Canabae of Eboracum, a residential and industrial area.  It is believed that, during the Viking, Jorvik, period, the street formed the eastern side of a lengthy open area.  The name of the street first appeared in 1303, arising from the charcoal merchants in the area.  A statue of Ebrauk, the legendary founder of the city, stood where the street meets St Saviourgate; this may have been a reused Roman statue.

Margaret Mason's Hospital, an almshouse, was built on the street in 1732, and survived until the 1950s.  In 1829, the northern end of the street was widened by demolishing part of Holy Trinity, King's Court.  The church was entirely removed in 1937, and King's Square enlarged, so Colliergate now runs up part of the east side of the square.  The Colliergate drill hall was opened on the street in 1872, while Barnitts department store opened on the street in 1896.  Over time, it has expanded, and it now occupies the drill hall, among other buildings.

Architecture and layout

The street runs from King's Square south to the junction of St Saviourgate and Whip-Ma-Whop-Ma-Gate.  North of King's Square, its continuation is Petergate.  Almost all the buildings on the street are listed.

On the west side of the street, numbers 1 and 2, and 3, 4 and 4A date from the Georgian period.   5 Colliergate was originally built in the 16th century, and is also noted for its modern ogee arched doorway.  The street continues with building remodelled in the Georgian era: 6 and 7, 8, 9, 10, 11, and 13 and 14, of which 9 and 11 contain some Mediaeval material.  On the east side, all the buildings are listed, most being Georgian.  Nikolaus Pevsner describes number 18 and 19 Colliergate as the best building, built in 1748 by Ralph Yoward, while 23 is notable for its staircase, built in 1700.  Numbers 21, 22 and 27 have earlier origins, and include some timber framing.

References

Streets in York